Elaine Carroll (born 1984) is an American actress. She is best known for her role as a fictionalized Mary-Kate Olsen on the web series Very Mary-Kate.

Life and career

Carroll was born in New York City, she and her family moved to Richmond, Virginia at the age of five. She grew up loving all forms of the arts, and began doing plays in first grade when her class put on a production of The King and I.

"I decided I wanted to be an actor when I was 7 and I never changed my mind," Carroll has stated. At age 10, Carroll attended the School of Performing Arts in the Richmond Community.

In 2001 she graduated from Mills Godwin High School, and spent time in London while working at an Express. She has a BFA in Acting from Marymount Manhattan College, and she studied improv and sketch at the Upright Citizens Brigade Theatre where she performs regularly.

In 2008 Carroll used an impression of the Olsen twins during an audition for Saturday Night Live. Carroll indicated that, "It went over really well," but "obviously I didn't get on the show." She continued to do the impression, and had been doing it for about two years before making a short video called "The Olsen Twin Minute" that "featured Mary-Kate and Ashley in a talk show." The experience led Carroll to realize she wanted to do more with the twin impression and "started trying to visualize what life is like for them. They're rich and famous, but also kind of mysterious and private, which leaves a ton of room for the imagination." Taking facts she already knew, such as Olsen's use of a bodyguard and taking classes at NYU, Carroll crafted a web series that "started filling in the blanks." In 2010, she began to star on Very Mary-Kate, a web series she also created and wrote. Very Mary-Kate is the "unofficial biography of everyone's favorite Olsen twin," Mary-Kate Olsen. The series follows Mary-Kate's daily adventures as Carroll portrays Olsen as a "character who's a weak-yet-demanding kitten obsessed with calories, abusing her bodyguard and getting her hands on the good drugs."

The series was originally produced out-of-pocket, but was picked up for its second season by CollegeHumor. The show's fourth and final season premiered on CollegeHumor on January 17, 2013. Very Mary-Kate received positive reviews. The Wall Street Journal called the web series "a viral sensation". The  stated that, Elaine has brought one of the funniest and best web-series to the internet. Her performance as the rich teen princess and her rich teen princess twin sister is flawless, (flawless in the sense that we've never met the Olsen twins but we've always assumed that they acted just as Elaine portrays them). Less than two minutes in length, each
episode is guaranteed to have you laughing within the first 12 seconds (how exact!) and you will no doubt be hooked as we were and will certainly need to check out more of her stuff.

In 2010 she had appeared in an episode of the AMC drama series Mad Men. While, the next year she had a small role as a nurse in the thriller film The Good Doctor.

In 2013, Carroll began to co-star in the web series Precious Plum, a parody of the reality show Here Comes Honey Boo Boo. The show was about Plum
(Carroll), a child beauty pageant contestant whose mother takes her to shows and it deals with the misfortunes they faced on the way.
The same year Carroll was listed as one of Vulture's "50 Comedians You Should and Will Know" and one of Complex's "25 Funny People Who Should Get Their Own TV Show."

In 2015, she was cast as Harriet Eisele on The Astronaut Wives Club, an American period drama television series. The Astronaut Wives Club premiered on June 18, 2015. ABC canceled the series after one season.

Filmography

References

1984 births
Living people
Actresses from New York City
Actresses from Richmond, Virginia
Marymount Manhattan College alumni
American web series actresses
American television actresses
21st-century American actresses